Hilary Burn (born 8 April 1946 in Macclesfield, Cheshire) is an English wildlife illustrator.

Career
Burn is the daughter of Colin Barber, an engineering draughtsman. She attended the Macclesfield High School and studied at the University of Leeds where she graduated to Bachelor of Science in zoology. From 1968 to 1971 she was a biology teacher at a comprehensive school in Leeds. In 1971 she began her career as illustrator for natural history books and she illustrated birds in gouache. In 1983 she was elected member of the Society of Wildlife Artists. Burn illustrated many ornithological works, including 15 volumes of the Handbook of the Birds of the World and the Helm Identification Guides.

Selected works
Handbook of the Birds of the World, Lynx Edicions (1994 - 2011, volumes 2 to 16)
Wildfowl: An Identification Guide, Helm, 1988
Crows and Jays, Helm
Handbook of Bird Identification, Helm
RSPB Book of British Birds, Macmillan
RSPB Handbook of British Birds
James Eaton, Bas van Balen, N. W. Brickle, Frank E. Rheindt: Birds of the Indonesian Archipelago., 2016.

References
Who's who in art. Art Trade Press Limited, 1996. :p 69

External links
Mall Galleries Federation of British Artists Hilary Burn
Profile at the Society of Wildlife Artists

1946 births
Living people
Alumni of the University of Leeds
Artists from Leeds
British bird artists
English zoologists
People from Macclesfield